Dancing Dynamite is a 1931 American pre-Code crime drama film directed by Noel M. Smith. It premiered in New York on 18 August 1931, and was distributed by State Rights and Mercury Pictures. Dancing Dynamite was filmed on location at Santa Catalina Island.

Cast 
Richard Talmadge as Dick Barton
Blanche Mehaffey as Helen Van Lane
Robert Ellis as Lucas
Richard Cramer as Kelsey
Harvey Clark as Murray Van Lane
Dot Farley as Effie
Jack Ackroyd as Shorty
Stanley Blystone as Bull Evans
Walter Brennan as henchman

Reception 
A review from The Film Daily on 16 August 1931 praised the film, particularly Talmadge's performance, writing; "Fast action meller with Richard Talmadge out[-]stunting himself in thrill stuff that will please the fans."

A negative review from Variety on 25 August wrote that Dancing Dynamite was a "badly knit story" adding "It is 63 minutes of silly clowning interspersed with acrobatics by Richard Talmadge."

References

External links 
 
 

1931 films
1931 crime drama films
American black-and-white films
American crime drama films
Films directed by Noel M. Smith
1930s English-language films
1930s American films